Magnar Hellebust (30 June 1914 – 15 February 2008) was a Norwegian politician for the Liberal Party.

He served as a deputy representative to the Parliament of Norway from Troms during the terms 1969–1973 and 1973–1977. In total he met during 73 days of parliamentary session.

References

1914 births
2008 deaths
Liberal Party (Norway) politicians
Deputy members of the Storting